"Suspicious Minds" is a 1968 song written and first recorded by the American songwriter Mark James. After this recording failed commercially, it was recorded by Elvis Presley with the producer Chips Moman. Presley's version reached No.1 on the US Billboard Hot 100.

The song
The song is about a  mistrusting and dysfunctional relationship, and the need of the characters to overcome their issues in order to maintain it. Written in 1968 by Mark James, who was also the co-writer of "Always on My Mind" (which Presley would later record), the song was first recorded and released by James on Scepter Records in 1968. Chips Moman had asked James to come to Memphis to write songs for American Sound Studio.  At the time, James was residing in Houston. He had written three songs that became No.1 hits in the Southern United States. American Sound Studio was gaining a reputation in the industry, as the Box Tops had just recorded "The Letter" there, so James relocated to Memphis.

James said that late one night, he was fooling around on his Fender guitar and using his Hammond organ pedals for a bass line and came up with what he thought was a catchy melody. At the time, he was married to his first wife but still had feelings for his childhood sweetheart, who was married back in Houston. James's wife had suspicions about his feelings.  He felt it was a confusing time for him and that all three were "caught in this trap that they could not walk out of." At the recording session, James sang the lead vocals and the studio band backed him; Moman produced. The horns, strings, and vocals of the Holladay Sisters were later overdubbed. After the tape was mixed, James and Moman flew to New York, where James's manager had contacts with Scepter Records. The label loved the song and put it out, but Scepter did not have the money to promote new artists and the song did not make the charts.

Later that year, Don Crews, Moman's partner, told James that Presley had booked their studio to record what would become the From Elvis in Memphis album. Crews kept asking James if he had any songs that would be right for Presley. James felt Presley needed a mature rock 'n' roll song to bring him back, as Tom Jones was a popular artist at the time. Crews and James thought of "Suspicious Minds" and James began urging others to get Presley to hear it. Though James's recording had not been commercially successful, upon reviewing the song, Presley decided he could turn it into a hit.

Elvis Presley recording

Background
Presley had not recorded in Memphis since 1955. Presley's 1969 recordings at American Sound Studio were a direct consequence of the '68 Comeback Special, that interested Chips Moman in producing recordings in Presley's new style; he was making his comeback to the Memphis musical scene by recording rock, gospel, country, rhythm & blues, and soul. Marty Lacker, a close friend of Elvis, suggested he record at the studio. These sessions produced the album From Elvis in Memphis.

American Sound Studio session
"Suspicious Minds" was a product of a session that took place between 4 and 7 a.m. on Thursday, January 23, 1969.  James was in Memphis, but he was not at the recording session. A few days earlier, he had walked into the recording studio during a session and sensed that Presley was uncomfortable with his presence. James did not want to jinx the song, so he stayed away. When he heard the track the day after it was recorded, he initially thought it sounded too slow. When he later heard the embellished version, he said he was blown away. In later years, whenever Presley saw James, he would cross the room to say hello.

Production of the song was nearly scuttled over a copyright dispute. Presley's business people said they wanted half of Moman's publishing rights. Moman accused them of stealing and threatened to halt the recording session. Harry Jenkins of RCA agreed with Moman because he sensed that "the song would be a big hit and there would be plenty to go around".
The songs "I'll Hold You In My Heart (Till I Can Hold You In My Arms)", "Without Love (There Is Nothing)", and "I'll Be There" were recorded in the same session. On August 7, "Suspicious Minds" was again overdubbed to stereo and mono in Las Vegas, where the final master was produced. The song's time signature changes in the bridge section, from 4/4 to the slower 6/8, then back again to the faster 4/4 rhythm. The instrumental arrangement uses an electric guitar, bass guitar, organ, strings, trumpets, trombones, and drums. As Parade magazine wrote in a survey of some of Presley's biggest hits, the recording "boasts one of the most innovative arrangements in Elvis' career ... two time-signature changes, a jangling electric guitar, spiraling strings, pumping horns and a barreling backup choir."

RCA staff producer Felton Jarvis made the unusual decision to add a fade-out to the song starting at 3:36 and lasting for nearly 15 seconds before fading back in. The first verse then continues repeatedly until the song completely fades out at 4:22. In a 2012 interview with Marc Myers of The Wall Street Journal, Moman disclosed that Jarvis was never happy with Presley recording at American Sound Studio, saying "it was a control thing". Moman added, "So when Jarvis took the tape of 'Suspicious Minds', he added this crazy 15-second fade toward the end, like the song was ending, and brought it back by overdubbing to extend it. I have no idea why he did that, but he messed it up. It was like a scar. None of which mattered. Soon after the song was released, Elvis was back on top of the charts."

Future Grateful Dead vocalist Donna Jean Godchaux sang backing vocals on the track.

"Suspicious Minds" was one of the singles that revived Presley's chart success in the U.S., following his '68 Comeback Special.  It was his 18th and last No.1 single in the United States. In December 2003, Rolling Stone ranked it No. 91 on their list of the 500 Greatest Songs of All Time. Session guitarist Reggie Young played on both the James and Presley versions.

The song was later included on the legacy edition of From Elvis in Memphis and the follow that dream reissue of Back In Memphis.

Personnel 
Sourced from Keith Flynn.
 Elvis Presley – lead and harmony vocals, guitar 
 Glen Spreen – string and horn arrangements 
 Reggie Young – guitar
 Bobby Wood – piano
 Bobby Emmons – Hammond organ
 Mike Leech – bass
 Gene Chrisman – drums

Overdubbed:
 Art Vasquez, Norman Prentice, Bobby Shew – trumpets
 Archie LeCoque, Johnny Boice – trombones
 Kenneth Adkins – bass trombone 
 Donna Thatcher, Mary "Jeannie" Greene, Ginger Holladay, Mary Holladay  – backing vocals

Release and performances
Presley first performed the song at the Las Vegas International Hotel (later renamed the Hilton) on July 31, 1969, and the 45 rpm single was released 26 days later.  It reached No.1 on the US Billboard Hot 100 for the week of November 1 and stayed there for one week.  It would be Presley's final No.1 single on the Billboard Hot 100, before his death ("Burning Love" in 1972 was a No.1 hit on the Cashbox chart; "The Wonder of You" in 1970, "Way Down" in 1977, and Junkie XL's remix of "A Little Less Conversation" in 2002 all hit No.1 on the British chart, followed by re-issues of several previous chart-toppers in 2005).

Charts and certifications

Weekly charts

Year-end charts

Certifications

Fine Young Cannibals version

In 1986,  the band Fine Young Cannibals' cover version, which features backing vocals by Jimmy Somerville, reached No. 8 on the UK Singles chart.  Singer Roland Gift said that Elvis had come to him in a dream and told him he would record the greatest version of "Suspicious Minds" ever.

The Fine Young Cannibals' music video for the song was filmed in black and white and, for most of it, remains that way. However, the video is noted for its innovative use of colorization, following the bridge section of the song. The video pays homage to Elvis, both in its use of the monochrome filming (common during Elvis' early career) and the shiny spangled suits that the band wear in the second half of the video.

Charts

Weekly charts

Year-end charts

Dwight Yoakam version

In 1992, country singer Dwight Yoakam recorded his version, for the soundtrack of the film Honeymoon in Vegas, and also filmed an accompanying video. The track was later released on his compilation album The Very Best of Dwight Yoakam.

Chart performance

Gareth Gates version

Gareth Gates, a runner up of in the first series of the ITV talent show Pop Idol, released a cover version on BMG on September 23, 2002. The single was a double-A side record containing "The Long and Winding Road"/"Suspicious Minds" with the Beatles song performed by Will Young, the winner of the same Pop Idol series, and Gates, with Gates performing the Elvis song on his own.

The music video features Gates changing color, alternating between black and white in a white background, while clips from Lilo & Stitch are shown.

Charts
The single reached the top of the UK Singles Chart where it stayed for two consecutive weeks (charts of September 29, 2002 and October 6, 2002), following two other No. 1 songs of Gareth Gates which were also covers ("Unchained Melody" - No. 1 for 4 consecutive weeks in March and April 2002 and "Anyone of Us (Stupid Mistake)" - for 3 weeks in July 2002).

Other notable cover versions
Dee Dee Warwick, Dionne's sister, covered "Suspicious Minds" while Elvis Presley's version was still on the charts. Warwick's version was a minor U.S. pop hit, peaking at No. 80 in 1970. It reached No.24 on the Billboard R&B chart for May 8, 1971.

Waylon Jennings and Jessi Colter recorded the song for RCA in 1970. Their version reached No. 25 on the Billboard country chart in November of that year. The Jennings-Colter version was re-released by RCA in 1976, topping out at No. 2, and was included on the album Wanted! The Outlaws that same year. Their version was nominated for a Grammy Award for Best Country Performance by a Duo or Group with Vocal.

Candi Staton had a No. 31 UK hit with her revival in 1982.

The melody of the song "Ignudi fra i nudisti", contained in the album Studentessi by Elio e le Storie Tese, was written by listening to this song in reverse.

In 2022, the singer Paravi recorded the song for the movie Elvis.

References

1968 songs
1969 singles
1986 singles
1992 singles
2002 singles
Billboard Hot 100 number-one singles
Cashbox number-one singles
Dwight Yoakam songs
Elvis Presley songs
Fine Young Cannibals songs
Gareth Gates songs
Number-one singles in Australia
Number-one singles in Scotland
Number-one singles in South Africa
UK Singles Chart number-one singles
Dee Dee Warwick songs
Waylon Jennings songs
Jessi Colter songs
Sakis Rouvas songs
Miss Kittin songs
Songs written by Mark James (songwriter)
Song recordings produced by Chips Moman
Song recordings produced by Stephen Lipson
Song recordings produced by Felton Jarvis
RCA Records singles
Scepter Records singles
London Records singles
I.R.S. Records singles
Epic Records singles
Bertelsmann Music Group singles
Torch songs
Song recordings produced by Pete Anderson
Number-one singles in Belgium
RPM Top Singles number-one singles
Rock ballads